A list of films produced in Pakistan in 1983 (see 1983 in film) and in the Urdu language:

1983

See also
1983 in Pakistan

References

External links
 Search Pakistani film - IMDB.com

1983
Pakistani
Films